Wutongjie is a metro station of Zhengzhou Metro Line 1 located beneath the crossing of Changchun Road and Wutong Street in the Zhengzhou National High & New Technology Industries Development Zone. It was opened on 12 January 2017 together with the phase II project of Line 1.

The station is named after Wutong Street.

Station layout 
The station has 2 floors underground. The B1 floor is for the station concourse and the B2 floor is for the platforms and tracks. The station has one island platform and two tracks for Line 1.

Exits

References

Stations of Zhengzhou Metro
Line 1, Zhengzhou Metro
Railway stations in China opened in 2017